Cvetan Grozdanov (5 March 1936 – 30 March 2018) was an art historian from Macedonia. He was born in Ohrid, Kingdom of Yugoslavia. Grozdanov was a president of the Macedonian Academy of Sciences and Arts in period 2004—2008. He was a member of the Serbian Academy of Science and Arts since 2003.

References 

1936 births
2018 deaths
People from Ohrid
Members of the Serbian Academy of Sciences and Arts
Academic staff of the University of Belgrade
University of Belgrade Faculty of Philosophy alumni